Hanchey Army Heliport  is a military heliport serving Fort Rucker in Dale County, Alabama, United States.

Facilities 
Hanchey AHP has one runway designated 17/35 with an asphalt surface measuring 467 by 50 feet (142 x 15 m).

See also 
 Fort Rucker, located at 
 Cairns Army Airfield, located at 
 Lowe Army Heliport, located at

References

External links 

 Fort Rucker, official site
 Aerial image as of 18 February 1997 from USGS The National Map
 Airfield photos for HEY from Civil Air Patrol
 

Airports in Dale County, Alabama
Military heliports in the United States
Military installations in Alabama
United States Army airfields